Choi Ji-woo (born Choi Mi-hyang on June 11, 1975) is a South Korean actress.  Considered one of South Korea's most beautiful women, she has received critical acclaim for her work in a wide range of melodramas, most notably Beautiful Days (2001), Winter Sonata (2002),  Stairway to Heaven (2003),
Air City (2007), Star's Lover (2008), The Suspicious Housekeeper (2013) and Temptation (2014), as well as the romantic comedy series Twenty Again (2015) and Woman with a Suitcase (2016).

 Career 
1994–1998: Beginnings
Choi Mi-hyang was first discovered when she won a talent audition organized by MBC in 1994, then made her acting debut in the drama series War and Love in 1995. Afterwards, she adopted the stage name Choi Ji-woo.

She was cast in her first major role in 1996 film The Gate of Destiny, but her limited acting skills resulted in her being replaced during filming. In the next couple of years Choi continued to star in both TV dramas and films, including The Hole (the Original version of Hollywood thriller Hush), as well as the romantic comedies First Kiss with Ahn Jae-wook and The Romantic President with Ahn Sung-ki. It was her portrayals on TV of tragic heroines with a pure and innocent image—notably in Truth opposite Ryu Si-won and Beautiful Days opposite Lee Byung-hun—that boosted her rising popularity.

In 2002, she reunited onscreen with Bae Yong-joon (she previously had a supporting role in his 1996 drama First Love) that she would star in her most famous, iconic role. Directed by Yoon Seok-ho as the second installment of his "season dramas," Winter Sonata became a phenomenal hit throughout Asia and has been credited as one of the initiators of the Korean Wave. As a result, Choi gained wide pan-Asian recognition, especially a huge following in Japan where she acquired the nickname Ji-woo Hime ("Princess Ji-woo"). In 2009 she and Bae reprised their roles as voice actors for Winter Sonata Anime. She continues to be a lucrative star and brand in Japan, fetching high licensing/broadcasting rights for her dramas and selling out concerts and merchandise (tvN's E News compiled a list of the top Hallyu stars in Japan based on their approximate gross incomes for the first half of 2011, and Choi was number five with approximately ).

After the success of her 2003 melodrama Stairway to Heaven with Kwon Sang-woo, Choi again attempted to break into film. She played a terminally ill heroine in Now and Forever,"Yeonriji ("Now and Forever") Depends Heavily on Ji-woo Hime". The Korea Times via Hancinema. 13 April 2006. and a more risque character in sex comedy Everybody Has Secrets ("The Original Version of Irish film About Adam)."Sex and Laughter in a Game of Love". The Dong-a Ilbo. 29 July 2004. Both films were poorly received by critics and audiences in South Korea, but performed well at the Japanese box office.

Choi then spent the next few years overseas, shooting the Chinese drama 101st Proposal with Sun Xing, and the Japanese drama RONDO opposite Yutaka Takenouchi. She returned to Korean television in 2007 in Air City alongside Lee Jung-jae; her role was the Chief Operating Officer of Incheon Airport.

2009–2012: Breakthrough
In 2009, she starred opposite Yoo Ji-tae in the drama Star's Lover, playing a top actress who falls in love with an ordinary man. The Chosun Ilbo. 12 April 2011.

That same year, she set up her own management agency called C,JW Company with her brother as CEO. She also joined the ensemble cast of semi-improvisational mockumentary Actresses, arguably her most significant film yet."Actresses is a miracle achieved, says Koh (Part 2)". 10Asia. 23 November 2009.

During the press conference for the 2011 series, Can't Lose, co-starring Yoon Sang-hyun, featuring a lawyer couple facing their own divorce suit, she was asked if she worried about shedding her pure and innocent image. Choi said, "I've had the same image for 15 years. Isn't it time for me to break out? I was a melodrama queen and now I want the title of romantic comedy queen." She added that she had gained more fans after showing her cheerful, easygoing side as a guest on the reality show 2 Days & 1 Night."Choi Ji-woo Thrilled About Shaking Off Old Image". The Chosun Ilbo. 25 August 2011.

In 2012, Choi was cast in the Chinese drama City Lovers, in which she portrayed the CEO at an event management company opposite Qin Hao, a newly employed businessman at her firm.

Later that year, she became the host of Choi Ji-woo's Delicious Korea on food lifestyle cable channel O'live TV alongside fashion designer Jung Kuho. The 5-episode show, which aired from November 23 to December 21, 2012, aimed to promote Korean cuisine and culture to the world, and the two hosts traveled through South Korea and introduced little-known regional food to the viewers.

She next headlined the 2013 remake of the hit 2011 Japanese drama Kaseifu no Mita. In The Suspicious Housekeeper, Choi played the titular character, an icy and stoic yet amazingly capable housekeeper who comes to work for a recently widowed father and his four children. Despite the difficulty of not being able to react to her costars, Choi said she chose the role because she "was really charmed by the way the heroine refrains from letting her emotions show."

2014–2016: Career resurgence
In February 2014, Choi signed with the talent agency YG Entertainment. She then reunited with previous costar Kwon Sang-woo in Temptation; she played a rich woman who makes a dangerous offer to a married man.

Choi joined the fourth season of travel-reality show Grandpas Over Flowers in 2015, where she and Lee Seo-jin backpacked through Greece with veteran actors Lee Soon-jae, Shin Goo, Park Geun-hyung and Baek Il-seob.
This was followed by the cable series Twenty Again, where she gained critical acclaim as a shy 38-year-old housewife who decides to experience campus college life for the first time alongside her 20-year-old son.

In 2016, Choi returned to the big screen in seven years, starring in the ensemble cast romance film Like for Likes. The same year, she starred in the legal romance drama Woman with a Suitcase.

In 2017, Choi was cast in the family melodrama The Most Beautiful Goodbye, a remake of the drama The Most Beautiful Goodbye in the World by Noh Hee-kyung.

In 2019, Choi made a cameo appearance as herself in episode 13 of the tvN drama, Crash Landing on You''.

Personal life 
Choi majored in aerobic dance at Busan Women's College. She later enrolled in Hanyang University's Department of Theater and Film and completed her first year; however she had to withdraw from college studies due to her hectic work schedule.

Choi married her non-celebrity boyfriend who is 9 years younger, on March 29, 2018, in a private wedding, only publicly announcing it just hours prior through a handwritten letter released in her fan club website. Choi announced that she was pregnant with her first child on December 23, 2019, and gave birth to a daughter on May 16, 2020.

Filmography

Film

Television series

Web series

Variety show

Music video

Awards and nominations

References

External links 

 

Articles with hCards
1975 births
IHQ (company) artists
Living people
People from Busan
South Korean film actresses
South Korean television actresses
South Korean female models
YG Entertainment artists
20th-century South Korean actresses
21st-century South Korean actresses
Ji-woo